Transport in Bangalore consists of several intracity commute modes such as BMTC buses, Namma Metro rail services, taxis and auto rickshaws, as well as several intercity forms of transport: Government operated KSRTC, NWKRTC, KKRTC, other states RTC buses, Private bus operators, trains, and flights.

Intracity

Road

Bangalore has a road network of 10,200 kilometers, with a road density (length of road per square kilometer) of 8.2 km, according to a report by Global Mobility Monitor Network. This road density is substantially lower than of that of India's capital Delhi and cited as the reason for traffic congestion in the city.

Private And Rental Vehicles

At the end of the 2018–19 financial year, Bangalore had more than 80 lakh vehicles registered in the city, the most in India after Delhi. Over 55 lakh two-wheelers (motorcycles) and 15 lakh cars together make up for close to 85 percent of the vehicles. In 2018, Bangalore was reported to have the second highest number of two-wheelers in the country. Bangalore's car density (number of cars for every kilometer of road), however, was found to be 149 – much lower than other major Indian cities. App based rental motorcycles, bicycles and cars are also available for commuting.

Buses

Bangalore Metropolitan Transport Corporation (BMTC) buses are the primary mode of public transport in Bangalore. As of September 2019, BMTC operates a fleet of 6023 buses, which is 0.1% of vehicle population. BMTC has a daily ridership of 35.8 lakh. BMTC has 3 major bus stations i.e., Kempegowda Bus Station, Krishna Rajendra Market Bus Station (Kalasipalya Bus Station), or Shivajinagara Bus Station. BMTC also has 35 minor bus stations and 12 TTMCs in various locations in the city and suburbs.

Non-AC buses are branded as "Bengaluru Sarige". Mini Non-AC buses as "Samparka". AC buses as "Vajra". Airport bound AC buses as "Vayu Vajra" and Bus Priority lane buses as "Nimbus".

In 2006, BMTC became the first state road transport undertaking to utilize air-conditioned buses for intra-city transport. As of 2019, BMTC has 825 air-conditioned Volvo buses branded as "Vajra". Several tech parks and groups of companies in the city have partnered with BMTC to provide dedicated bus routes, such as ORRCA, for their employees in order to reduce vehicular traffic. BMTC also operates air-conditioned "Vayu Vajra" buses from different parts of the city to the Kempegowda International Airport. These buses have fewer stops compared to other bus routes.

BMTC issues different types of bus passes for its passengers including yearly student passes, monthly and daily passes. A survey conducted in 2019 found that nearly 48 percent of BMTC passengers have bus passes.

BMTC ridership saw a decline starting from 2014 to 2015, due to various factors. In 2019, BMTC's operating loss was reported to have gone up from 1.06 per km in 2018–19 to 4.32 per km in 2019–20. The same year, it was announced that BMTC buses will be provided a "priority lane" on 12 high-density corridors in late-2019 to reduce traffic congestion and travel time branded as "Nimbus".

Taxis

The number of registered cabs in Bangalore was reported to be 1.66 lakh in November 2018, having doubled from 2015. This increase was attributed to the rising popularity of app-based taxi-hailing services such as Ola Cabs and Uber, which have "revolutionised" transport in the city while contributing to the increase in traffic. Taxi services, along with Namma Metro, caused the decline in BMTC and rickshaw ridership, according to a report in The Times of India.

Prior to the entry of Ola Cabs and Uber, Bangalore had taxi services such as Meru Cabs, KSTDC and Mega Cabs. Meru Cabs started plying in 2007, whereas the government-owned KSTDC entered the industry in 2009, providing taxis to and from the airport, in partnership with the Bangalore International Airport Limited.

Some companies also operated bike taxis in Bangalore but the state transport department deemed them to be illegal.

Auto Rickshaws

Auto rickshaws are used in the city for traveling short distances. As of January 2019, Bangalore has 1.94 lakh auto rickshaws, out of which more than 25,000 are two-stroke rickshaws. Two-stroke rickshaws, which are said to be a major cause of sound and air pollution, will be allowed to ply only until 2020. Rickshaw drivers in the city are known to charge the customer extra and seldom use the meter. In 2014, Ola Cabs introduced on-demand rickshaw hailing services on its platform, making Bengaluru the first city to get "Ola Auto" Uber also re-introduced 'Uber-Auto' in Bangalore on 2018.

As of 2017, the city does not have permission to run electric rickshaws (e-rickshaws) which are smaller than normal auto rickshaws and have a maximum speed of 25kmph. Bangalore Traffic Police stated that, although eco-friendly, e-rickshaws "would slow down vehicular movement."Though e-rickshaws are allowed in other parts of the State in 2021, it is still not allowed in Bengaluru. However, the city does have permission to operate e-autorickshaws.

Rail

Metro rail

Namma Metro rapid transit system operated by Bangalore Metro Rail Corporation Limited (BMRCL) began construction in 2008 and operation started in 2011, after missing several deadlines. As of 2019, it has 40 operational stations across two lines (Green Line and Purple Line), covering a distance of 42.3 km. Several stations are under construction as part of Phase 2 on these two lines, with Yellow, Red and Blue Lines also proposed. The Metro runs six-car and three-car trains which have total capacity of 2002 and 975 respectively. The average daily ridership was reported to be 4.5 lakh in 2019.

Namma Metro has seen a steady growth in passenger footfall and popularity since 2017. However, the compartments are reported to be highly crowded during peak hours, despite addition of more trains during such time. There have been claims that Metro has caused road traffic congestion around its stations due to a lack of efficient last-mile connectivity.

Lines:

 Purple Line (Extension Under Construction)
 Green Line (Extension Under Construction)
 Yellow Line (Under Construction)
 Pink Line (Under Construction)
 Blue Line (Under Construction)
 Orange Line Corridor - 1 (Planning)
 Orange Line Corridor - 2 (Planning)

Commuter/Suburban rail

A 148.17 km commuter rail network project has been approved and is under construction. It will be operated by Bangalore Suburban Rail Company Limited (BSRCL).

Lines:

 Sampige Line (Under Construction)
Mallige Line (Under Construction)
Parijaata Line (Under Construction)
 Kanaka Line ( Under Construction)

Intercity

Buses

The Karnataka State Road Transport Corporation (KSRTC), headquartered in Bangalore, along with sister corporations NWKRTC and KKRTC runs intercity buses from the city to various parts of Karnataka as well as neighbouring states. It operates ordinary seater bus services with the brand name "Karnataka Sarige (Karnataka Roadways)". Non-air conditioned sleeper and semi-sleeper with the brand name "Ultra Deluxe Rajahamsa". It was the first state RTC to launch air-conditioned buses in 2002–03 under the brand name "Airavat" these buses are single-axle Semi-sleeper, manufactured by Volvo, Scania and Mercedes-Benz (Previously). "Airavat Club Classes" are multi-axle. Air-conditioned sleeper buses manufactured by Corona are branded as "Ambaari Class" and those manufactured by Volvo are branded as "Ambaari Dream Class".

Apart from KSRTC, a number of private operators and other state RTCs ply buses from Bangalore to different parts of South India, West India and Rajasthan. According to a 2012 report in The Hindu, more than 6000 buses belonging to KSRTC, NWKRTC, KKRTC and other states' RTCs, as well as 2000 private buses run from Bangalore to other cities.

Bus Stations 
 Kempegowda Bus Station (Majestic Bus Station)
 Mysuru Road Bus Station
 Basaveshwara Bus Station (Tumakuru Road Bus Station)
 Atal Bihari Vajpayee TTMC (Shantinagara Bus Station)
 Krishna Rajendra Market Bus Station (Kalasipalya Bus Station)

Rail

Bangalore is part of the South Western Railway zone of the Indian Railways and is well connected to various parts of the country by rail network.

Air

Bangalore is India's third largest city and fourth largest metropolitan Area. It is well connected by air to all the important destinations domestically and Internationally. It houses India's third busiest Airport. The current airport situated 40 km from the heart of the city on NH 44 was built in 2008 due to the growing air traffic and expansion constraints at HAL Airport.

Airport:
 Kempegowda International Airport - Bengaluru

References

 
Transport in Karnataka